The first World Mind Sports Games (WMSG) were held in Beijing, China from October 3 to 18, 2008, about two months after the Olympic Games. They were sponsored and organised by the International Mind Sports Association with the General Administration of Sport of China and the Beijing Municipal Bureau of Sport.

Five mind sports participated in the first Games: bridge, chess, draughts (checkers), go (weiqi), and xiangqi (Chinese chess). Thirty-five gold medals were contested by 2,763 competitors from 143 countries.

According to the World Bridge Federation, it incorporated the World Team Olympiad (1960–2004) and some established youth events in the Games "as the stepping stone on the path of introducing a third kind of Olympic Games (after the 'regular' Olympics and the Paralympics)".

Events
 35 set of medals :
 Bridge (9)
 Draughts (10)
 Chess (5)
 Go (6)
 Xiangqi (5)

Bridge

The World Bridge Federation organized eleven events in Beijing that constituted the "World Bridge Games" including nine WMSG medal events. Six were among the established world bridge championships contested in even-number years.
The other three were for "youth" under age 28, a one-time compromise.
More than 1400 players participated, about half of all players in the Games. Entries from European Bridge League countries
won 22 of the 27 medals, led by Norway with six medals including two gold.

Two other events were continued by the WBF from its quadrennial "Olympiad" program, as part of its new "World Bridge Games" but separate from the WMSG (non-medal events sharing the facilities). Japan won the third Senior International Cup, for national teams of seniors (age 58+). 'Yeh Bros' from Chinese Taipei won the second Transnational Mixed Teams, for teams of any nationality comprising mixed pairs, one man and one woman.

Chess

The World Chess Federation organized ten events in Beijing, all of them in rapid or blitz chess.

Draughts

Under the auspices of the World Draughts Federation 288 players participated in five medal events in Beijing. There was a strong regional showing as twelve of the fifteen medals were won by players from Russia, Latvia, Moldova, and Ukraine.

Go

Under the auspices of the International Go Federation 560 players participated in six medal events in Beijing. South Korea won half of the 18 medals and all were swept by competitors from Eastern Asia.

Xiangqi
Xiangqi, or "Chinese chess", was the fifth sport to participate in Beijing, where 125 players participated in five events. Although the World Xiangqi Federation was not a member of IMSA at the time, the sport was included in the Beijing games as a traditional Chinese sport with a large number of players, especially in China. The host country won all five gold medals.

Medals
Teams from the host country China won one-quarter of the 105 medals, including one-third of the gold.

See also 

 World Mind Sports Games
 International Mind Sports Association
 Mind sport
 Mind Sports Organisation

Notes

References

External links 

International Mind Sports Association official website. Confirmed 2011-05-25.
World Mind Sports Games. International Mind Sports Association. 2008 or earlier. Posted at usgo.org American Go Association. Confirmed 2011-08-31. (Second copy at World Bridge Federation.)
2008 Mind Sports Games Releases Official Logo and Slogan. 2008-04-09. China Radio International.
Beijing hosts first 'Mind Games'. 2008-10-03. BBC News.
 Bridge – Official "World Bridge Games" top page
Chess – Official participants list
Draughts – Official participants list
Go – American Go Association advance top page

 
2008
World Mind Sports Games 2008
2000s in Beijing
2008 in multi-sport events
International sports competitions hosted by China
2008 in Chinese sport
Multi-sport events in China
2008 in chess
2008 in draughts
2008 in go